Towchal may refer to:

Towchal, Semnan
Towchal, Tehran